A Woman Has Killed (Italian: Una donna ha ucciso) is a 1952 Italian melodrama crime film directed by Vittorio Cottafavi. While on a train journey a young woman tells another passenger how she murdered her husband, a British army officer. It is a neorealist film, based on the real story of Lidia Cirillo, who appears in the film.

The film's sets were designed by the art director Ottavio Scotti.

Cast
Frank Latimore as 	Capt. Roy Prescott
Lianella Carell as 	Anna
Alessandro Serbaroli as 	Larry (as Alex Serbaroli)
Vera Palumbo as 	Carla
Umberto Spadaro as 	Padre di Anna
 Marika Rowsky 
 Celeste Aída 
 Diego Muni 
 Vincenzo Milazzo 
 Pia De Doses 
 Lidia Cirillo

References

Bibliography
 Bayman, Louis. The Operatic and the Everyday in Postwar Italian Film Melodrama. Edinburgh University Press, 2014.

External links
 

1952 films
1952 crime drama films
Italian crime drama films
1950s Italian-language films
Films directed by Vittorio Cottafavi
Mariticide in fiction
Films scored by Renzo Rossellini
Melodrama films
Italian black-and-white films
1950s Italian films